George Walter "Watch" Burnham (May 20, 1860 – November 18, 1902) was an American umpire and manager in Major League Baseball who was briefly in the National League in the 1880s. He was born in Albion, Michigan.

Umpiring career
Burnham began his major league officiating career in  when he called 41 National League games. On July 25 of that season, he called balls and strikes for a no-hitter thrown by "Old Hoss" Radbourn of the Providence Grays.

In all, Watch umpired 107 games, 99 of which were behind the plate.

Managerial career
Burnhan began the  season as the manager of an upstart National League team, the Indianapolis Hoosiers. However, after a very slow start, the team had a 6–22 record, and was in last place; he was fired on June 2. Fred Thomas took over as interim manager in addition to his front office duties.

Later life
Watch Burnham died at the age of 42 in Detroit, Michigan, and is interred at Oakwood Cemetery in Saline, Michigan.

References

External links
Baseball-Reference.com - career managing record
Retrosheet

1860 births
1902 deaths
Indianapolis Hoosiers (NL) managers
Sportspeople from Michigan
Major League Baseball umpires
People from Albion, Michigan